The Haji Yusoff Mosque is a mosque located in Hillside Drive, off Upper Serangoon Road, Singapore. It is a Wakaf type of mosque.

This redeveloped mosque is located in the Northeast part of the island was first built in 1896. It underwent redevelopment in 1995 and can now accommodate up to 400 people. Some of its activities include madrasah classes and religious lectures for adults.

History
In the past, many philanthropists donated land and money towards the building of charitable and religious institutions in Singapore. One such donor was Ahmad Mohamed Salleh Angullia who donated a piece of land (lot 114, mukim XXII), located at the junction of Upper Serangoon Road and Hillside Drive, for the building of a mosque to meet the needs of the Muslims living in the area.

On 21 February 1920, he legally appointed Shaik Omar bin Abdullah Bamadhaj and Haji Mohamad Eusofe to be his contrustees in the management of Masjid Haji Yusoff.

The mosque was built in 1921, occupying an area of 67 square metre. As time went by, the building could not accommodate all the worshippers from Serangoon, Toa Payoh, Aljunied and neighboring constituencies. More space was needed and in September 1973, the building was extended. A dome was also added. The cost of extension amounted to S$35,000 which come from public donations. The extensions took seven months to complete. Besides religious activities and religious knowledge classes, the mosque also organized tuition classes in English Mathematics Arabic and typing.

Transportation
The mosque is accessible from Kovan MRT station.

See also
 Islam in Singapore

References

External links
 GoogleMaps StreetView of Masjid Haji Yusoff

Haji Yusoff
Mosques completed in 1921
20th-century architecture in Singapore